Austin Cooper (1930 – 24 September 2013) was a  Canadian criminal lawyer. His cases include  defending Rolling Stones guitarist Keith Richards in the 1970s for heroin possession and Susan Nelles, a nurse who was accused of murdering babies during a spree of deaths at a Toronto hospital. He was a graduate of Osgoode Hall Law School.

References

1930 births
2013 deaths
Osgoode Hall Law School alumni
Lawyers in Ontario